Sathankulam is an assembly constituency located in Thoothukudi district in Tamil Nadu. It falls under Tiruchendur Lok Sabha Constituency. It is one of the 234 State Legislative Assembly Constituencies in Tamil Nadu, in India.

Madras State assembly

Tamil Nadu assembly

Election Results

2006

Bye-election, 2002

2001

1996

1991

1989

1984

1980

1977

1971

1967

1962

1957

1952

References

External links
 

Former assembly constituencies of Tamil Nadu
Thoothukudi district